Susana Isabel Pinilla Cisneros is a Peruvian anthropologist and politician. She has served as Minister of Labor and Promotion of Employment, Women's and Social Development Minister, and as CAF Country Director. She has an anthropology degree from National University of San Marcos and a Masters in "Governance and Public Policy" from the Universidad de San Martín de Porres.

References 

Year of birth missing (living people)
Living people
Government ministers of Peru
Women's ministers
Peruvian anthropologists
Peruvian women anthropologists
National University of San Marcos alumni
Women government ministers of Peru